Jaxon Benge (born Jackson Lee Benge) is the former guitarist for American punk rock band, Hed PE. He exclusively uses Ibanez Seven-string guitars in the studio and when performing live. Jaxon utilizes a number of styles in his music such as Speed metal and reggae tinged guitar riffs among several others and names legendary guitarists, Jimi Hendrix, Randy Rhoads and Dimebag Darrell as his biggest influences as a guitar player.

Jaxon joined Hed PE in February 2004 with his studio guitar playing debut on Only in Amerika and left the band in early 2015.

History
Jaxon is noted for having 10 years of guitar playing experience prior to his introduction to Hed PE in 2004 bringing in a total of 19 years since 1994. Jaxon uses seven-string guitars when performing with Hed PE, but he is able to play six and twelve-stringed guitars as noted by his blog.

Jaxon was first considered to become Hed PE's second guitarist after the departure of Chad "Chizad" Benekos during the recording of Hed PE's third studio album, Blackout but was passed on for a more well known guitarist, Sonny Mayo, who is the former guitarist of alternative metal band Snot. When Sonny left Hed PE at the end of the Blackout tour, Jaxon took his spot and has been the band's only guitarist ever since, playing the roles of both rhythm and lead guitar. Before 2011, he often played onstage wearing white face paint covered with black X's as well as white tees soaked in black dye following the same color scheme and pattern, hence the "X" in Jaxon.

As of 2008, Jaxon has been regularly updating his MySpace album "Demo-Itis" with exclusive guitar instrumentals that he has written including raw versions of Represent, Walk On By, Ordo Ab Chao, Renegade, No Rest For The Wicked, and N.O.C. These instrumentals show a more experimental side of Jaxon where he tends to explore different types of musical genres such as psychedelic and funk.

In early 2015, it was confirmed that Jaxon had left Hed PE along with original bassist Mark Young, and had been replaced by Greg "Gregzilla" Harrison.

Equipment And Guitar Rig 
Ibanez Seven-string guitars
EMG, Inc. 707 pick-ups
Monster Cables
GH patched cable strings
D'Addario strings

Pedal Board
(Not necessarily in order)
Pedaltrain Pro Pedals
Cry Baby Classic Wah Pedals
Boss Chromatic Tuner
Boss DD-6 Digital Delay
Behringer Midi Foot Controller
Voodoo Lab Pedal Power

Amps
Marshall JMP-1 pre amp
Marshall 9200 Dual Mono Bloc Power Amp
Furman Power Conditioner
Korg Rack Tuner
2 Ibanez 4×12 Cabinets
Celestion Vintage 30s
Egnater Tourmaster 4100 Head and 2 Egnater Tourmaster 412A 280W 4x12 Cabinets

References

American punk rock guitarists
American rock guitarists
Musicians from Long Beach, California
Living people
Seven-string guitarists
Guitarists from California
American male guitarists
Hed PE members
Year of birth missing (living people)